Krćevac (Cyrillic: Крћевац) is a village in the Topola municipality of the Šumadija District in Central Serbia, located 3.9 km from Zagorica and 5.2 km from Topola.

Etymology 
The name "Krćevac" stems from "krčanje" which translates to "burning/clearing of forest". The region of Šumadija was/is densely wooded and so the village owes its name to the intense forest clearing effort that was undertaken when the area was settled. Local lore holds that the area of today's Krćevac burned for three months before the land became clear for farming.

Demographics 
According to the 1991 census data, the population was 794. According to the 2002 census, this had declined slightly to 775, composed of 636 adults, with an average age of 42.9 years (41.9 years among males and 43.8 years among females). There were 216 households in the village with an average of 3.59 members per household.

In 2002, Serbs constituted 98.7% of the population, Montenegrins 1.03%, Croats 0.12%, and Muslims 0.12%.

Historic Sites 
Krćevac is home to a fountain built by Alexander Karađorđević on 29 September 1858. Karađorđević built the fountain on the land that he had known, and tended to, since childhood. The land was the same location of Karađorđe Petrović's farm fields. The land was sold by the House of Obrenović during the 1868-1883 period.

The Ottoman Turks referred to Krćevac as Karađorđe's House of Hajduks ('ajdučka kuća) due to the wooded areas of Krćevac serving as a safe haven for those who fought to abolish Turkish rule during the First Serbian Uprising.

Gallery

References 

 Knjiga 9, Stanovništvo, uporedni pregled broja stanovnika 1948, 1953, 1961, 1971, 1981, 1991, 2002, podaci po naseljima, Republički zavod za statistiku, Beograd, maj 2004,  (Government census data)
 Knjiga 1, Stanovništvo, nacionalna ili etnička pripadnost, podaci po naseljima, Republički zavod za statistiku, Beograd, februar 2003,  (Government census data)
 Knjiga 2, Stanovništvo, pol i starost, podaci po naseljima, Republički zavod za statistiku, Beograd, februar 2003,  (Government census data)
 
 
 

Populated places in Šumadija District